Microsoft Cinemania was an interactive movie guide as part of the Microsoft Home series of reference and educational multimedia application CD-ROM titles produced by Microsoft and published annually beginning in 1992 until 1997.

History 
The software was available for both Windows and Macintosh. Early versions for Windows were 16-bit, Cinemania 96 had both 16-bit and 32-bit EXEs for compatibility with Windows 3.1 and native Windows 95 support respectively. The last edition of Cinemania was released in 1997 and is the only purely 32-bit version. This version was supported on Windows 95 or Windows NT, or Apple Macintoshes running System 7. Melinda Gates, ex-wife of Bill Gates, worked on the development of this software in the early 1990s.

Content 
The software was mainly a database of films, in a similar fashion to the Internet Movie Database, and gave descriptions of the films and who starred in them. Most of this information was not readily accessible before broadband internet.

Cinemania contained professional material by:
 Leonard Maltin: 19,000 reviews from his Movie and Video Guide
 Roger Ebert: over 1300 reviews from his Video Companion (starting from the 2nd edition, published as Cinemania '94)
 Pauline Kael: 2500 reviews from her 5001 Nights at the movies book (also starting with Cinemania '94)
 Baseline: The Motion Picture Guide and The Encyclopedia of Film
 James Monaco: How to Read a Film
 Ephraim Katz: The Film Encyclopedia

The program also included over 2000 still images for movies and actors, a large number of sound clips, dialogues and soundtracks, and a smaller selection of full-motion video clips. As the amount of material increased with each new edition, the quality of media tended to decrease, in order to fit everything on a single CD-ROM. Cinemania 97 also had guided tours from numerous celebrities and online features which made use of an associated MSN website. It could be updated monthly over the Internet, which brought new movies, new material about older movies and new celebrity tours.

References

External links 

 https://www.wired.com/1994/11/cinemania-94/
 http://ew.com/article/1995/11/24/microsoft-cinemania-96/
 http://www.technofile.com/articles/cinemania.html
 https://www.pcworld.pl/news/Microsoft-Cinemania-97,297664.html
 http://articles.latimes.com/1995-04-02/entertainment/ca-49831_1_film-clips
 http://adage.com/article/news/microsoft-ceases-production-cinemania-music-central/4935/
 http://www.denofgeek.com/movies/microsoft-cinemania/36973/remembering-microsoft-cinemania

Cinemania
Educational software for Windows